John Gordon Williamson (born 1949) is a Scottish musicologist and retired academic. After studying music and history at the University of Glasgow, he completed his doctoral studies at Balliol College, Oxford. In 1974, he was appointed to a lectureship at the University of Liverpool; he was subsequently a professor of music and head of the School of Music there. He specialises in Austro-German music between 1850 and 1950, and he has studied the works of Pfitzner, Strauss, Liszt, Mahler and Wolf.

Selected publications 
 The Music of Hans Pfitzner (Oxford University Press, 1992).
 Strauss: 'Also Sprach Zarathustra (Cambridge University Press, 1993).
 (Editor) The Cambridge Companion to Bruckner (Cambridge University Press, 2004).

References 

Living people
1949 births
Scottish musicologists
Alumni of the University of Glasgow
Alumni of Balliol College, Oxford
Academics of the University of Liverpool